The Ringgold Isles are an archipelago in Fiji, forming an outlier group to Vanua Levu.  The Budd, Nukusemanu, and Heemskercq Reefs form part of the group.  The group is mostly uninhabited, but Qelelevu has a small village.  In 2008 Pacific rats were eradicated from seven islands of the group in an endeavour facilitated by BirdLife International's Fiji Programme.

A  area covering the archipelago is the Ringgold Islands Important Bird Area. This area supports globally and regionally significant populations of marine turtles, humpback whales, seabirds and semi-nomadic reef fish, and may hold concentrations of cold-water corals.

Cakau Matacucu

Cobia

Cobia is an island in Fiji, and is a member of the Ringgold Isles archipelago, which forms an outlier group to the northern island of Vanua Levu.  It has a land area of 69.29 hectares.

Lailai

Maqewa

Maqewa Island is narrow and rocky.  It has a total land area of 26.05 hectares.

Mota Levu

Nanuku Levu

Nukubalati and Nukubasaga

A single coral reef with two rock bound islands, one larger than the other

Qelelevu

Qelelevu is a coral islet in Fiji, a member of the Ringgold Isles archipelago, which forms an outlier to the northern island of Vanua Levu. Qelelevu covers an area of 1.5 square kilometers.

The small village of Nalutu is located on Qelelevu. Fishing is the only significant economic activity.

Raranitiqa

Raranitiqa Island in Fiji, a member of the Ringgold Isles archipelago, which forms an outlier group to the northern island of Vanua Levu.  It has a land area of 2.49 hectares.

Taininbeka

Taininbeka is an atoll in Fiji, a member of the Ringgold Isles archipelago, which forms an outlier group to the northern island of Vanua Levu.  This uninhabited islet is situated at 16.04° South and 179.09° East, and has a total land area of 144.34ha.

Tauraria

Tauraria is an atoll in Fiji, a member of the Ringgold Isles archipelago, which forms an outlier group to the northern island of Vanua Levu. This uninhabited islet is situated at 16.04° South and 179.09° East. Its land area is 11.06 hectares.

Vetauua
Vetauua is a small, uninhabited cay.

Vucovuco

Yanuca

Small mountain island. Inhabited by about 60-80 people who live in a small village in a tiny beach cove.

References

 
Archipelagoes of Fiji
Island restoration
Archipelagoes of the Pacific Ocean
Important Bird Areas of Fiji